The Hellecasters are an American guitar group.  Composed of noted session players Will Ray, John Jorgenson (Desert Rose Band, and Elton John's backing band), and Jerry Donahue (Fairport Convention), they all play guitars by other manufacturers, but styled after Fender Telecaster as their main instruments. 
 
In 1988, Will Ray produced an album named "Hollywood Roundup", featuring an assortment of local musicians.  One of the instrumentals included several of his acquaintances (John Jorgenson, Jerry Donahue, Jeff Ross, and Billy Bremner) who recorded the track under the name of "Candye Kane and the Super Pickers".

According to Jerry Donahue, after running into Will Ray in 1990 at the Palomino, he proposed that they play a set together at an open-mike session at the same club. Will Ray then asked John Jorgenson to join them so as to have three-part harmonies. Their name was coined by John Jorgenson.  Michael Nesmith of the Monkees attended their April 1991 show and subsequently signed them to his record label.  Their first two albums, The Return of the Hellecasters and Escape from Hollywood, were released by Nesmith's Pacific Arts Audio label.

Discography

Albums

Multi-artist collections

References

American rock music groups